Ryszard Stanisław Przybysz (8 January 1950 – 23 February 2002) was a Polish handball player who competed in the 1976 Summer Olympics.

He was born in Koło and died in Łódź.

In 1976, he won the bronze medal with the Polish team. He played all five matches and scored 13 goals.

External links 
 profile

1950 births
2002 deaths
Polish male handball players
Handball players at the 1976 Summer Olympics
Olympic handball players of Poland
Olympic bronze medalists for Poland
Olympic medalists in handball
People from Koło County
Sportspeople from Greater Poland Voivodeship
Medalists at the 1976 Summer Olympics